Clean Rite Cowboy is a Canadian short drama film, directed by Michael Downing and released in 2000. The film stars John Robinson as Henry, an unhappily married man with a dead-end job as a carpet cleaner, who knocks on a client's door one day only to have his high school girlfriend Diane (Christie MacFadyen) open the door.

The film's cast also includes Gloria Slade as his wife Mona, Luca Perlman as their son Paul, and Tracy Wright and Judy Marshak in supporting roles.

The film premiered on September 9, 2000, at the 2000 Toronto International Film Festival.

It received a Genie Award nomination for Best Live Action Short Drama at the 21st Genie Awards in 2001.

References

External links
 

2000 films
2000 drama films
2000 short films
2000s English-language films
Canadian drama short films
2000s Canadian films